Media General was an American media company based in Richmond, Virginia. The company's origins can be traced back to 1887 when Richmond attorney Joseph Bryan acquired The Richmond Daily Times, which later became The Richmond Times-Dispatch. Joseph Bryan's son, John Stewart Bryan succeeded his father as owner and publisher of the Times-Dispatch, which merged with The Richmond News Leader in 1940 to form Richmond Newspapers, Inc.

After John Stewart Bryan's death in 1944, his son, D. Tennant Bryan led the company into a period of expansion into television, changing the company's name to Media General in 1969. Media General, Inc. began trading on the American Stock Exchange in 1970.

In 1990, J. Stewart Bryan III, great-grandson of Joseph Bryan, became chairman, president and chief executive officer of Media General. The fourth-generation Bryan oversaw the company's expansion into digital media and the sale of Media General's newspaper division to Berkshire Hathaway in 2012. J. Stewart Bryan III remained chairman of Media General until his death on January 23, 2016.

In 2013 and 2014, Media General expanded significantly through mergers with Young Broadcasting and LIN Media. After the latter merger, LIN Media CEO Vincent L. Sadusky became chief executive officer of Media General while former Young Broadcasting CEO Deborah A. McDermott led station operations as Chief Operating Officer. Long-time Media General CFO James F. Woodward remained as Chief Financial Officer until the company's dissolution in 2017.

On January 11, 2017, the FCC approved the sale of Media General to Nexstar Broadcasting Group for $4.6 billion.

History

The conglomeration of newspapers was founded in 1940 when owners of Richmond, Virginia's two newspapers, the Times-Dispatch and News Leader, merged them to form Richmond Newspapers, Inc. In 1966, it purchased a majority interest in the Tampa Tribune, which included WFLA-AM-FM-TV in Tampa, making that the company's first ever foray into television, a strategy that was later used by such acquisition practices.  In 1969, as the company's media properties grew and diversified, it was renamed Media General.

Additional acquisitions
In 1981, the company began its expansion practice of television stations under the Media General Telecommunications subsidiary. It first purchased WJKS-TV in Jacksonville from Ziff-Davis Broadcasting on December 7, 1981, for $18 million, the sale was approved on November 8, 1982. On July 5, 1982, the company bought out WCBD-TV in Charleston from the State Telecasting Company for $8 million, the deal was approved on January 24, 1983.

In 1982 the company acquired The William B. Tanner Company (previously known as Pepper-Tanner), a commercial radio jingle production company headquartered in Memphis. It was divested in 1988. In 1987, Media General, which included its Media General Broadcast Group comprising three television stations at that time, as well as its cable systems in various areas was sold off to a group led by The Giant Group, a firm owned by Burt Sugarman, which purchased a stake for $103.8 million, with backing also held by television production company Barris Industries.

In 1996, Media General acquired Park Acquisitions, the holding company for Park Communications, formerly owned by the media entrepreneur Roy H. Park.

In 1999, Media General bought Spartanburg-based Spartan Communications, which increased Media General's station portfolio from 14 to 27.

Four NBC-owned stations in smaller markets that were put up for sale on January 9, 2006. On April 6, NBC Owned Television Stations and Media General announced that the latter would purchase the four NBC O&O's as part of a $600 million four-station deal between the two companies.

Divestment of properties in the late 2000s 
On July 28, 2006, Media General announced that they would sell KWCH-TV and its satellites to a Schurz Communications-affiliated company Sunflower Broadcasting for $73 million. On August 2, 2006, Media General announced that it would sell WIAT and KIMT to New Vision Television for $35 million; the sale was finalized on October 12, 2006. Between 2006 and 2008, Morris Network, a division of Morris Multimedia bought out two station properties, WDEF and WTVQ, the former's price for WDEF cost $22 million, and the latter's price for WTVQ-TV cost $16.5 million, totaling up a $38.5 million budget for the combined two stations.

On October 29, 2007, Media General announced that the company was exploring the sale of WCWJ, KALB-TV, WMBB, WTVQ, and WNEG-TV. On March 14, 2008, the company reached an agreement to sell KALB and WMBB to Hoak Media. The deal was closed on July 16. On June 25, 2008, Media General announced the sale of WNEG-TV to the University of Georgia. On January 28, 2009, Nexstar Broadcasting Group announced that it had reached an agreement to purchase WCWJ. The deal was finalized on May 1, 2009.

2010s: Expansions, mergers with Young Broadcasting and LIN Media 
On June 6, 2013, Young Broadcasting announced that it would merge with Media General. On November 8, the FCC approved the merger. The merger closed on November 12. Following the merger, the new company was owned 67.5 percent by Young shareholders and 32.5 percent by Media General shareholders. The combined company owned 30 stations, reaching 14% of the United States. and continued to operate as Media General. Headquarters would remain in Richmond, Virginia, however, for the first time in over a century, the Bryan Family would not have a controlling interest in the company.

On March 21, 2014, Media General and LIN Media announced that the two companies would merge. The deal, worth an estimated $1.6 billion, would create an entity of 71 stations with a combined reach of 24% of U.S. television households. 45 Media General staff members were laid off; CEO George Mahoney stepped down in favor of his LIN counterpart Vincent Sadusky. In order to comply with FCC ownership rules as well as planned changes to rules regarding same-market television stations which would prohibit future joint sales agreements, some of the stations would be sold to several other companies in five markets (Birmingham, Green Bay, Mobile, Providence and Savannah) where both groups already own stations.

On August 20, 2014, Media General and LIN Media announced several sales. Media General sold WJAR, WLUK, WTGS and WCWF to the Sinclair Broadcast Group in exchange for Sinclair's KXRM, KXTU, WHTM and WTTA. Although the WHTM sale was discussed two months earlier, it was completed in September 2014, the rest of the transactions would not come into effect until the deal was completed. Hearst Television acquired WVTM and WJCL, and Meredith Corporation acquired WALA. On October 6, the two companies' shareholders approved the deal, and the FCC approved the deal on December 12. The merger was completed on December 19. A condition of the deal requires Media General to end the joint sales and shared services agreements it has with stations in Youngstown, Ohio, Dayton, Ohio, and Topeka, Kansas, due to tighter scrutiny such deals are getting by the FCC. Media General received a two-year waiver in those markets to end the JSAs and SSAs.

On July 14, 2015, Media General pulled its stations off of Mediacom cable systems across the United States due to a carriage dispute over retransmission consent fees. This carriage dispute saw Media General stations disappear from Mediacom lineups in 14 television markets across the United States and even three of the Fox affiliates owned by Media General were lost to Mediacom subscribers in Hampton Roads, Virginia, Terre Haute, Indiana, and Topeka, Kansas just before the start of the 2015 Major League Baseball All-Star Game. On July 30, 2015, Mediacom and Media General reached a new agreement, thereby restoring Media General owned stations to Mediacom subscribers in the affected areas.

On July 13, 2016, the FCC issued a $700,000 fine against Media General for using a shared services agreement with WAGT to prevent its new owner Gray Television from divesting it in the spectrum incentive auction.

Aborted merger with Meredith; acquisition by Nexstar 
On September 8, 2015, it was announced that Media General would acquire Meredith Corporation in a cash and stock deal valued at $2.4 billion. Pending regulatory and shareholder approval, the deal was expected to be consummated in June 2016. The combined company was to be known as Meredith Media General, and become the third-largest owner of television stations in the United States—serving an estimated 30% of households. In order to comply with FCC regulations, some stations would have been sold to other companies in six markets where both groups already own stations (Greenville-Spartanburg, Hartford-New Haven, Mobile, Nashville, Portland (OR) and Springfield (MA)). Media General shareholders would have controlled 65% of the company, with Meredith shareholders holding 35%.

On September 28, it was revealed that Nexstar Broadcasting Group had made an unsolicited cash-and-stock offer for Media General, valued at $14.50 per-share. Following the announcement, Media General shareholders Oppenheimer Holdings (7% stake) and Starboard Capital (4.5% stake) opposed the Meredith merger in favor of selling to Nexstar. On October 6, 2015, the New York Post speculated that the deal had been called off, believing that the deal was unlikely to receive further shareholder support due to these objections. Both companies have denied that this was the case, and reported that other major shareholders were backing the merger. Media General hired additional firms to evaluate the Nexstar bid. On November 16, Media General rejected the offer but agreed to negotiate after concluding its merger with Meredith.

On January 27, 2016, Media General announced that it had entered into a definitive agreement to be acquired by Nexstar in a deal valued at $17.14 per-share, valuing the company at $4.6 billion plus the assumption of $2.3 billion debt. The combined company will be known as Nexstar Media Group, and own 171 stations, serving an estimated 39% of households. The company will pay Meredith a termination fee of $60 million, and give Meredith right of first refusal to acquire any broadcast or digital properties that may be divested during the merger (a clause that Meredith did not exercise). The deal also includes contingent value rights for Media General shareholders if it sells spectrum from its stations during the FCC's spectrum incentive auction.

The transaction was approved on January 11, 2017, with the sale consummated six days later, on January 17.

Former assets

Newspapers
On May 17, 2012, it was announced that investment company Berkshire Hathaway would be acquiring Media General's newspaper division (excluding The Tampa Tribune); the newspapers to be merged into Berkshire Hathaway's World Media Enterprises division, a sister company of its other newspaper holdings under the Omaha World-Herald. The deal closed June 25, 2012.  Media General's chairman and former CEO, J. Stewart Bryan III said the company faced a choice: either sell its newspaper division or file for bankruptcy protection. The latter, he said, was "unacceptable." At the end of 2011, Media General had $658 million in debt.  In October 2012, The Tampa Tribune and its associated print and digital products were acquired by Tampa Media Group, Inc., a new company formed by Revolution Capital Group.

Major newspapers

Richmond Times-Dispatch
The Tampa Tribune	
Winston-Salem Journal

Community newspapers

Alabama
Dothan Eagle
The Enterprise Ledger
Opelika-Auburn News
The Eufaula Tribune
The Corner News

Florida

(Brooksville) Hernando Today (associated with The Tampa Tribune)
(Sebring) Highlands Today (associated with The Tampa Tribune)
Jackson County Floridan (Marianna)CENTRO Tampa (Spanish-language weekly)
(New Port Richey) The Suncoast News (associated with The Tampa Tribune)

North Carolina

The (Eden) Daily NewsHickory Daily RecordThe (Marion) McDowell NewsThe (Madison) MessengerThe (Morganton) News HeraldThe Reidsville ReviewStatesville Record & LandmarkSouth Carolina

The Morning News (Florence) Daily Newspaper for Florence and the Pee Dee RegionThe News and Post (Lake City)  WeeklyThe Marion Star (Marion) WeeklyThe Weekly Observer (Hemingway) WeeklyThe Hartsville Messenger  Weekly

VirginiaAmherst New Era-ProgressPowhatan TodayMidlothian ExchangeMechanicsville LocalGoochland GazetteBristol Herald CourierCulpeper Star-ExponentThe (Charlottesville) Daily ProgressDanville Register & BeeNelson County TimesThe News & Advance (Lynchburg)
The (Waynesboro) News VirginianNews & Messenger (Manassas) (defunct)Richlands News-Press/Clinch Valley NewsThe Richmond News Leader (defunct)Smyth News and Messenger (Marion)The Wytheville EnterpriseWashington County News (Abingdon)Greene County RecordMadison County EagleOrange County ReviewTelevision stations
Stations are arranged in alphabetical order by state and city of license.Notes: (**) – Indicates a station built and signed on by Media General.
 (¤¤) – Indicates a station owned by Park Communications prior to its acquisition by Media General in 1997.
 (##) – Indicates a station owned by Spartan Communications prior to its acquisition by Media General in 2000. (++) – Indicates a station acquired by Media General from NBC Owned Television Stations in 2006. (¥) – Indicates a station owned by Young Broadcasting prior to its merger with Media General in 2013. (§§) – Indicates a station owned by LIN Media prior to its merger with Media General in 2014.Other Notes:
 1 Owned by Schurz Communications, Media General operated WAGT under a shared services agreement (SSA), with WJBF.
 2 Owned by Vaughan Media, Media General operated the stations through an SSA.
 3 Owned by Shield Media, Media General operated the stations through an SSA.
 4 Owned by Tamer Media, LLC, Media General operated the stations through an SSA.
 5 Owned by Super Towers, Inc., Media General operated WNAC through a local marketing agreement.

Other assets
 Atlee Park
 Blockdot
 Boxerjam Media
 BiteSizeTV
 Hollywood Today Live'', a daily syndicated entertainment news program distributed by Media General stations, along with Fox Television Stations under a traditional syndication arrangement.
 LIN Digital

References

Companies formerly listed on the New York Stock Exchange
Defunct broadcasting companies of the United States
Companies based in Richmond, Virginia
Companies based in Tampa, Florida
Mass media companies established in 1940
Mass media companies disestablished in 2017
Nexstar Media Group
2017 mergers and acquisitions